György Csepeli (born 14 February 1946) is a Hungarian social psychologist, sociologist, politician, professor emeritus at the Eötvös Loránd University (ELTE), former Under Secretary of State for Political Affairs at the Ministry of Information of Hungary. His research, books, papers and talks focus on antiziganism, antisemitism and foundational problems of information society and social psychology.

Biography and career
He was born on 14 February 1946 in Budapest, Hungary. He took M.A. degree in Psychology and Russian studies in 1970 at the Faculty of Humanities of the Eötvös Loránd University (ELTE) in Budapest.

In 1980 he was awarded the candidate (C.Sc.) degree in Social psychology.

From 1986 until 2001 he acted as the head of the Social Psychology, ELTE.

He completed his Doctor of Science (D.Sc.) degree in Sociology in 1991 and then he received the title of university (full) professor at the Department of Social Psychology at the Institute of Sociology, ELTE in the same year.

He was the Under Secretary of State for Political Affairs at the Ministry of Information of Hungary during the premierships of Péter Medgyessy and Ferenc Gyurcsány between 2002 and 2006.

From 2009 until 2011 he managed the Department of Sociology, ELTE.

In 2016 the honorific title of professor emeritus was conferred upon him.

From 2019 he is the vice-president of the World Complexity Science Academy (WCSA) and associate editor of the journal of WCSA.

He lectured as a visiting professor at several universities in the world: Montclair State University in Montclair, New Jersey, United States, University of Nova Gorica in Slovenia, University of Michigan in Ann Arbor, Michigan, United States, Oregon State University in Corvallis, Oregon, United States.

His working papers were issued in both national and international prestigious professional research scientific journals, and 20 books and more than 500 scientific articles were published.

His main fields of interest are in the antiziganism, antisemitism and foundational problems of information society and social psychology.

Awards and honours
1980 Ferenc Erdei Prize
1996 Minorities Award
2020 Rézler Gyula award of the Hungarian Academy of Sciences

Selected works

Books
2020 Nation and Migration. Budapest: CEU Press (coauthored with A. Örkény)
2000 Grappling with National Identity. How nations see each other in Central Europe. Coauthored with A. Örkeny and M. Szekelyi Budapest: Akadémiai Kiadó
 Csepeli, Gy., Örkény, A., Székelyi, M. 2000. Grappling with national identity : how nations see each other in Central Europe. Szalay, É. (transl.) Budapest: Akadémiai Kiadó.
 Hagendoorn, L., Pepels, J., Cinnirella, M., Crowley, J., Witte, H., Verbeeck, G., Portengen, R., Westin, C., Junco, J.A., Nassehi, A., Peri, P., Jasinska, A., Pechacova, Z., Cerny, V., Malová, D., Mego, P., Csepeli, Gy., Örkény, A., Liiceanu, A., Bekeshkine, I., Djintcharadze, N., Farnen, R. 2000. In Hagendoorn, L., Csepeli, Gy., Dekker, H., Farnen, R., (eds.) European Nations and nationalism : theoretical and historical perspectives. Aldershot: Ashgate
 Csepeli, Gy. 1997. National identity in contemporary Hungary. Fenyo, M.D. (transl.) Boulder: Social Science Monographs; Highland Lakes: Atlantic Research and Publications, Inc.; New York: Distributed by Columbia University Press
1992 Ideology and Political Beliefs in Hungary. The Twilight of State Socialism. (coauthored with A. Orkeny) London: Pinter Publishers
 Csepeli, Gy. 1989. Structures and contents of Hungarian national identity : results of political socialization and cultivation. Frankfurt M., Bern: Lang

References

1946 births
Politicians from Budapest
Academic staff of Eötvös Loránd University
Living people
Eötvös Loránd University alumni
Hungarian sociologists
Social psychologists